Iberville Parish is a parish located south of Baton Rouge in the U.S. state of Louisiana, formed in 1807. The parish seat is Plaquemine. The population was 30,241 at the 2020 census.

History
The parish is named for Pierre Le Moyne d'Iberville, who founded the French colony of Louisiana.

A few archeological efforts have been made in the Parish, mainly to excavate the Native American burial mounds that have been identified there. The first expedition, led by Clarence B. Moore, was an attempt at collecting data from a couple of the sites, and it set the groundwork for later projects. Moore was mainly interested in the skeletal remains of the previous inhabitants, rather than excavating for archeological items. Archeologists are especially interested in these sites because of their uniformity and size. Some of the mounds are seven hundred feet long, a hundred feet wide and six feet tall. Most of them contain human remains.

Iberville Parish is represented in the Louisiana State Senate by a Republican, attorney Rick Ward III, a former member of the Louisiana House of Representatives, who has served in the Senate since 2012. The parish is currently represented in the state House by Democrat Major Thibaut of Oscar in Pointe Coupee Parish.

Geography
Iberville Parish is part of the Baton Rouge metropolitan statistical area.

Major highways
  Interstate Highway 10
  Louisiana Highway 1
  Louisiana Highway 30
  Louisiana Highway 69
  Louisiana Highway 75
  Louisiana Highway 76
  Louisiana Highway 77

Adjacent parishes
 Pointe Coupee Parish  (northwest)
 West Baton Rouge Parish  (north)
 East Baton Rouge Parish  (northeast)
 Ascension Parish  (east)
 Assumption Parish  (southeast)
 Iberia Parish  (south)
 St. Martin Parish  (west)

National protected area
 Atchafalaya National Wildlife Refuge (part)

Communities

Cities
 Plaquemine (parish seat)
 St. Gabriel (largest municipality)

Towns
 Maringouin
 White Castle

Villages
 Grosse Tete
 Rosedale

Unincorporated areas

Census-designated places
 Bayou Goula
 Crescent
 Dorseyville or Dorcyville (home of St John Baptist Church - National Register of Historic Places)

Other unincorporated communities
 Alhambra
 Bayou Pigeon
 Bayou Sorrel
 Iberville (home of Schexnayder House - National Register of Historic Places)
 Indian Village (on January 28, 1863, during Civil War, was the site of a Union-Confederate military skirmish)
 Seymourville

Demographics

As of the 2020 United States census, there were 30,241 people, 10,903 households, and 7,372 families residing in the parish. The 2019 census-estimates determined 32,822 people lived in the parish, down from 33,387 at the 2010 United States census, and up from 33,320 at the 2000 U.S. census.

In 2020, the racial and ethnic makeup of the parish was 48.2% Black and African American, 49.6% non-Hispanic white, 0.1% American Indian and Alaska Native, 0.5% some other race, and 1.5% two or more races. Approximately 2.6% of the population were Hispanic and Latin American of any race. In 2010, its racial and ethnic makeup was 49.3% Black and African American, 48.8% non-Hispanic white, 0.3% Asian, 0.2% American Indian and Alaska Native, 0.6% some other race, and 0.8% from two or more races; 2.0% were Hispanic and Latin American of any race. At the 2000 census. 49.26% were non-Hispanic white, 49.7% African American, 0.18% American Indian and Alaska Native, 0.26% Asian, 0.01% Native Hawaiian and other Pacific Islander, 0.14% from other races, and 0.45% from two or more races; 1.03% were Hispanic and Latin American of any race.

There were 10,903 households at the 2019 census-estimates, and 13,396 housing units. Of the 2,697 businesses operating in the parish, 1,339 were minority-owned. The parish had an employment rate of 47.9%. There was a home-ownership rate of 73.4%, and the median housing value was $143,700; the median gross rent was $755. The median income for a household was $50,161; males had a median income of $54,655 versus $30,773 for females; 27.6% of the population lived at or below the poverty line.

Among its religious population in 2020, the Association of Religion Data Archives determined there were 1,700 non-denominational Protestants, and 7,901 Roman Catholics. Non-denominational Christianity was the largest non-Catholic demographic, reflecting the rise of non/inter-denominationalism.

Government and infrastructure
The Louisiana Department of Public Safety and Corrections operates two prisons, Elayn Hunt Correctional Center and Louisiana Correctional Institute for Women (LCIW), in St. Gabriel in Iberville Parish. LCIW houses the female death row.

Education

Primary and secondary schools
Iberville Parish School Board operates the public schools within all of Iberville Parish.

Public libraries
Iberville Parish Library operates libraries in the parish. The Parish Headquarters Library is located in Plaquemine. Branches include Bayou Pigeon (Unincorporated area), Bayou Sorrel (Unincorporated area), East Iberville (St. Gabriel), Grosse Tete (Grosse Tete), Maringouin (Maringouin), Rosedale (Rosedale), White Castle (White Castle).

Colleges and universities
It is in the service area of South Louisiana Community College.

National Guard
The Gillis W. Long Center, located on the outskirts of Carville, LA, is operated by the Louisiana Army National Guard.  This post is home to the 415TH MI (Military Intelligence) Battalion, the 241ST MPAD, and the 61st Troop Command.  The 415TH MI is a subunit of the 139TH RSG (regional support group).

See also

 National Register of Historic Places listings in Iberville Parish, Louisiana
 Jessel Ourso, sheriff of Iberville Parish from 1964 to 1978; suspended, 1968-1972
 Edward J. Price, state representative for District 58, which includes Iberville Parish

References

External links
 Ibervillle Parish government's website
 Iberville Parish Tourist Commission website
 Explore the History and Culture of Southeastern Louisiana, a National Park Service Discover Our Shared Heritage Travel Itinerary
 Iberville Parish Sheriff's Office

Geology
 Heinrich, P. V., and W. J. Autin, 2000, Baton Rouge 30 x 60 minute geologic quadrangle. Louisiana Geological Survey, Baton Rouge, Louisiana

 
Louisiana parishes
Parishes in Acadiana
Acadiana
Baton Rouge metropolitan area
Louisiana parishes on the Mississippi River
1807 establishments in the Territory of Orleans
Populated places established in 1807
Majority-minority parishes in Louisiana